George Lunn (28 June 1915 – January 2000) was an English professional footballer who played in the Football League for Watford as a centre half.

Career statistics

References 

English Football League players
Clapton Orient F.C. wartime guest players
English footballers
Association football wing halves
1915 births
2000 deaths
People from Bolton upon Dearne
Frickley Athletic F.C. players
Chester City F.C. wartime guest players
Doncaster Rovers F.C. wartime guest players
Fulham F.C. wartime guest players
Northampton Town F.C. wartime guest players
Rochdale A.F.C. wartime guest players
Southport F.C. wartime guest players
Stockport County F.C. wartime guest players
Wrexham F.C. wartime guest players
Watford F.C. wartime guest players